Charles Lea MacDonald (born 13 February 1981) is an English footballer who plays for Barking.

Football career

Early career 
MacDonald played for the Millwall youth team before joining Charlton Athletic as a trainee, turning professional in August 1998. He made his Charlton debut on 3 January 2000, as a late substitute for Martin Pringle in a 3–0 win at home to Nottingham Forest. He started the FA Cup tie against Queens Park Rangers the following weekend, scoring the only goal as Charlton progressed to the fourth round. He made two further appearances as substitute that season and won the Charlton Young Player of the Year Award.

He joined Cheltenham Town on loan in March 2001, scoring twice in seven games with both goals coming in the same game against Blackpool. He returned to the Charlton first team squad later that year and scored his first ever Premiership goal when scoring the late equaliser in the 1–1 draw with Newcastle United at The Valley. However, that was his last involvement with the Charlton first team and in February 2002 he joined Torquay United on loan, playing five games without scoring. In March 2002 he joined Colchester United on loan, but made just four appearances and scored one goal, in a 2–2 draw with Wigan Athletic, before returning to his parent club at The Valley.

He was released by Charlton in May 2002 and joined Conference side Margate in August. After one goal against Forest Green Rovers and five appearances, the following month he moved to Conference rivals Stevenage Borough.

Crawley Town 
In August 2003 he moved to Crawley Town, and after an injury-troubled start, went on to play a crucial role in the club winning the Dr Martens League Premier Division and with it, promotion to the Nationwide Conference for the first time in its history. His best spell saw him score nine goals in seven matches – scoring in all seven. He was the side's leading scorer in the league, with 17 goals.

He had the honour of scoring Crawley's first ever goal in the Conference, part of a brace that saw them beat Leigh RMI away from home 2–1. He scored seven goals in the first two months, but eventually lost his place and was loaned out to Weymouth in April 2005.

Gravesend & Northfleet 
In May 2005 he moved to Gravesend & Northfleet and soon settled in as a regular in the Gravesend team and a regular on the scoresheet. His contract with Gravesend and Northfleet ended at the close of the 2006–07 season and put pen-to-paper on a two-year deal with Southend United, arriving at Roots Hall on a free transfer.

Southend United 
During his time at Southend he scored just once in the league against Doncaster Rovers, but he scored a further four goals in cup competitions with a goal against Watford in the League Cup, a brace against Oxford United in the FA Cup and another goal in the FA Cup against Dagenham & Redbridge.

Brentford 
He joined Brentford on 9 July 2008 for an undisclosed fee on a two-year contract. He scored 18 goals in his first season at the club, helping Brentford to win League Two. He was awarded the League Two Player of the Month award for February 2009. His first season was ended in March due to a shoulder injury; however, he bounced back to become Brentford's top scorer in the 2009–10 season. In his three-year stay at Brentford he scored a league goal every 2.7 games; 40 goals in 111 games at Griffin Park.

Milton Keynes Dons 
On 26 August 2011, Charlie MacDonald signed a two-year contract with Milton Keynes Dons for a £35,000 fee. MacDonald was the replacement for Sam Baldock, who recently left MK Dons to join West Ham United.

Leyton Orient 
MacDonald signed for Leyton Orient on a free transfer on 12 January 2013.

Oldham Athletic
MacDonald joined Oldham Athletic on a one-year contract in July 2013, with the option of a second year, after Leyton Orient chose not to extend his contract.

MacDonald's debut was against Stevenage FC in an epic match that ended 4–3 to Oldham Athletic, with MacDonald earning 2 penalties including the match-winner converted by Jose Baxter.
MacDonald's first goal for Latics was a consolation header in a 2–1 defeat to Peterborough United at London Road.

At the end of the 2013–14 season, the one – year option that the club had on MacDonald's contract was not exercised, and thus he was released. During his time at the club he had made 30 league appearances, scoring five goals.

Barnet
MacDonald joined Barnet on 16 July 2014. He scored a penalty on his debut, a 5–0 away win at Chester. He was appointed captain of the side by manager Martin Allen. After scoring eight goals during Barnet's promotion winning campaign, MacDonald was not offered a new contract with the Bees.

Boreham Wood
MacDonald joined Boreham Wood on 15 July 2015. He scored only twice in all competitions in the first half of the season and was loaned to St Albans City in January 2016. Director of football Ian Allinson stated that "it hasn't quite clicked for Charlie in his time with us. He is a great guy who just wants to play football and now he's fit, he was not getting the game time with us that he had hoped for".

Greenwich Borough

On 10 June 2016, MacDonald joined Isthmian Division One South side Greenwich Borough. He would spend a season and a half at the club, before financial constraints led to a number of players and staff leaving the club.

Cray Wanderers
On 10 January 2018, MacDonald signed for league rivals Cray Wanderers. He scored on his debut the same day, against VCD Athletic.

VCD Athletic
MacDonald joined VCD Athletic for the 2018–19 season, scoring twice on his debut against Ramsgate.

Glebe
MacDonald joined Glebe for the 2020–21 season.

Barking
MacDonald joined Barking for the 2021-22 season.

Coaching career 
MacDonald coaches at Bobby Bowry's Volenti Academy.

Personal life 
During his time as a player at Oldham Athletic, MacDonald studied for and obtained a degree in Professional Sports Writing & Broadcasting from Staffordshire University.

Honours
Charlton Athletic

 Football League First Division: 1999–00

 Crawley Town

 Southern League Premier Division: 2003–04

 Brentford

 League Two: 2008–09

 Barnet

 Conference Premier: 2014–15

Individual

Charlton Athletic Young Player of the Year: 1999–00
League Two Player of the Month: February 2009

References

External links

1981 births
Living people
Footballers from Southwark
English footballers
Association football forwards
Millwall F.C. players
Charlton Athletic F.C. players
Cheltenham Town F.C. players
Torquay United F.C. players
Colchester United F.C. players
Stevenage F.C. players
Crawley Town F.C. players
Margate F.C. players
Ebbsfleet United F.C. players
Southend United F.C. players
Brentford F.C. players
Milton Keynes Dons F.C. players
Leyton Orient F.C. players
Oldham Athletic A.F.C. players
Barnet F.C. players
Boreham Wood F.C. players
St Albans City F.C. players
Greenwich Borough F.C. players
Cray Wanderers F.C. players
VCD Athletic F.C. players
Glebe F.C. players
Barking F.C. players
Premier League players
English Football League players
National League (English football) players
Isthmian League players
Alumni of Staffordshire University